Buena Hora Airport  is an airstrip in the lightly populated pampa of the Beni Department of Bolivia.

See also

Transport in Bolivia
List of airports in Bolivia

References

External links 
OpenStreetMap - Buena Hora
OurAirports - Buena Hora
Fallingrain - Buena Hora Airport

Airports in Beni Department